Where Are They Now? (Traditional Chinese: 友緣相聚) is a show hosted by Lydia Shum in 2006, and was shown on TVB in 2006, as well as on Fairchild TV in Canada in 2007 and 2008. Throughout the 32 episodes, Lydia Shum travelled to Taiwan, Japan, USA, and Canada to interview popular celebrities of the 1960s in Hong Kong and Taiwan. Most of these celebrities have now emigrated to foreign countries.

Naming of Show
The show's title in Chinese is an idiom, which translates to "If we are predestined to meet, we will". The first character in the original idiom (有, meaning "have"), was swapped by another character (友, meaning "friends") with the same pronunciation, which turns the meaning of the title to "We are predestined as friends, and we are meeting [again]".

Future of Show
It was speculated that the show was to go longer than 32 episodes, with Lydia Shum traveling to Australia and other countries to interview more former celebrities. However, by the time the show was completed, Shum's health was failing, and production was halted at 32 episodes. It has been speculated that TVB has made plans for Joyce Cheng, Lydia's daughter, to host the show after Shum passes on. Shum died on 19 February 2008.

Cast list

References

TVB original programming